For the Country of Our Dreams (Por el País que soñamos) is a political party in Colombia. The party took part in the parliamentary elections of 2006, in which it won 2 out of 166 deputies and no senators.

Political parties in Colombia